Autonomous Design Group (ADG) is an anonymous anti-capitalist, anti-authoritarian art collective founded in the United Kingdom in 2019. The group produces political artwork for posters and stickers as well as use online. The group publishes their work in an editable open-source format using a Creative Commons NonCommercial license.

References

External links
Official website
2019 establishments in the United Kingdom
Anti-capitalist organizations
British artist groups and collectives
Progressive International